A travel pack is a specialized type of rucksack developed for adventurers, and popular with backpackers. Much like ordinary rucksacks in appearance, travel packs have the added benefit of being able to zip shoulder straps, hip belts and shoulder harnesses out of sight. Additionally, many travel packs, being internal frame packs, have concealed parallel stays designed to offer added support.

Travel packs offer a good fit due to their extensive use of straps, webbing and frame. Many travel packs have additional loops and straps for sleeping bags and other items.

A personal travel pack should consist of a few important things like paper, soap, hair oil, face cream, toothbrush, comb, towel and handkerchief that will help make travel a pleasurable experience. Nowadays, many companies are planning to launch products with special travel cases. For example, the Burst electric toothbrush comes with its own travel case so that you can carry it without any problem.

History
Mountain Equipment Inc's Voyageur was one of the original travel packs to hit the US market in the 1970s. Other manufacturers such as Patagonia, Tough Traveler and Easy Going were quick to follow. 

With increased airline restrictions, there is renewed interest in travel packs, as they offer the ability to be used as carry on luggage.

See also
 Backpacking (travel)
 Rucksack

References

Luggage
Bags
Travel gear